Special Task Force may refer to:

 Special Task Force (SAPS), a South African Counter-Terrorist force
 Special Task Force (Sri Lanka), Sri Lankan Police Counter-Terrorist force
 Special Task Force (India) an Indian Counter-Terrorist force

See also 
 STF (disambiguation)